Pedro Zêzere Neves Carneiro (born 25 November 1997) is a Portuguese footballer  who plays for C.D. Pinhalnovense as a midfielder.

Football career
On 23 July 2017, Carneiro made his professional debut with Cova da Piedade in a 2017–18 Taça da Liga match against Nacional.

References

External links

1997 births
Living people
Footballers from Lisbon
Portuguese footballers
Association football midfielders
Liga Portugal 2 players
Campeonato de Portugal (league) players
Casa Pia A.C. players
C.D. Cova da Piedade players
C.D. Pinhalnovense players
Segunda División B players
San Fernando CD players
Portuguese expatriate footballers
Portuguese expatriate sportspeople in England
Portuguese expatriate sportspeople in Spain
Expatriate footballers in England
Expatriate footballers in Spain